Fakruddin Hussain Mohsin (23 January 1923 – 3 September 1996), often shortened as F. H. Mohsin, was an Indian politician and Freedom Fighter. He was 5-time Member of Parliament (MP), and represented Dharwad South in the Lok Sabha the lower house of the Parliament of India. He was also Member of Parliamentary Delegation to U.A.R., Sudan and Algeria.

Early life and background 
Mohsin was born on 23 January 1923 in Hiremadapur village, in Hirekerur Taluk, Dharwad district. Hussainsab was his father. He completed his schooling in D.A.. LL.B from Ranebennur Municipal High School, Basel Mission High School Dharwad, Karnatak College Dharwad and Sykes Law College, Kolhapur.

Personal life 
Mohsin married Rahamatunnissa on 3 May 1953 and the couple has four sons and three daughters.

Freedom Movement 
Mohsin actively participated in the freedom movement by organising the students.

Position held

Death 
He died in Bangalore on 3 September 1996, at the age of 73.

References

1923 births
1996 deaths
India MPs 1962–1967
India MPs 1977–1979
India MPs 1967–1970
India MPs 1971–1977
India MPs 1980–1984
People from Dharwad district
Lok Sabha members from Karnataka
Indian National Congress politicians from Karnataka